Martha Manzano (born 1 July 1953) is a Colombian diver. She competed in the women's 3 metre springboard event at the 1968 Summer Olympics. She was the first woman to represent Colombia at the Olympics.

References

1953 births
Living people
Colombian female divers
Olympic divers of Colombia
Divers at the 1968 Summer Olympics
Sportspeople from Cali
20th-century Colombian women